Kõrsikud is an Estonian band.

In 2014, the band won one award in Estonian Music Awards, namely, in the category "best band of the year".

Members
Jaan Pehk
Andrus Albrecht
Alari Piispea
Lauri Liivak.

Discography

Albums
2012 "Kolme peale"
2013 "Sinu südames"

References

Estonian musical groups